The D.I.C.E. Award for Outstanding Technical Achievement is an award presented annually by the Academy of Interactive Arts & Sciences during the academy's annual D.I.C.E. Awards. "The award celebrates the highest level of technical achievement through the combined attention to gameplay engineering and visual engineering. Elements honored include but are not limited to artificial intelligence, physics, engine mechanics, and visual rendering."

The most recent winner was Elden Ring, developed by FromSoftware and published by Bandai Namco Entertainment.

History
The first and second awards offered the Outstanding Achievement in Software Engineering. In 2000 the award for software engineering was separated into separate awards for Outstanding Achievement in Gameplay Engineering and Outstanding Achievement in Visual Engineering. Gameplay Engineering recognized "the highest level of achievement in engineering artificial intelligence and related elements which contribute to a challenging game". Visual Engineering would recognize "the highest level of achievement in rendering 3-D virtual environments for an interactive title." The two categories would be merged into the Outstanding Technical Achievement in 2015. 
 Outstanding Achievement in Software Engineering (1998–1999)
 Outstanding Achievement in Gameplay Engineering (2000–2014)
 Outstanding Achievement in Visual Engineering (2000–2014)
 Outstanding Technical Achievement (2015–present)

There was tie for the award in Outstanding Achievement in Gameplay Engineering in 2006 between Guitar Hero and Nintendogs.

Winners and nominees

1990s

2000s

2010s

2020s

Multiple nominations and wins

Developers and publishers 
Sony has published the most nominees and has published the most winners so far. Sony's subsidiary Naughty Dog has developed the most winners while Nintendo EAD (now EPD) has developed the most nominees. There have been two developers to have back-to-back wins for Outstanding Achievement in Gameplay Engineering:
Nintendo EAD: Nintendogs in 2006 and Wii Sports in 2007.
Ubisoft Montreal: Tom Clancy's Splinter Cell in 2003 and Prince of Persia: The Sands of Time in 2004.
There are four developers that developed the winners for both awards for Gameplay Engineering and Visual Engineering: EA Canada, Ubisoft Montreal, Valve, and Naughty Dog. Electronic Arts published the winners for both awards with different developers for different games in 2008. Sony published the winners for Visual Engineering for four consecutive years with LittleBigPlanet(2009), Uncharted 2: Among Thieves(2010), Heavy Rain(2011), and Uncharted 3: Drake's Deception(2012). Activision has published the most nominees without having a single winner. Electronic Arts developer DICE has developed the most nominees without having a single winner.

Franchises
Call of Duty has been the most nominated franchise so far, but it has never won. Uncharted is the most award-winning franchise so far, with Uncharted 2: Among Thieves being one of four games to win both awards in gameplay and visual engineering. The other three are SSX, Prince of Persia: The Sands of Time, and Half-Life 2.

Notes

References 

D.I.C.E. Awards
Awards established in 1998